The 1901 Rhode Island Rams football team represented the University of Rhode Island in the 1901 college football season. Led by fourth-year head coach Marshall Tyler, they finished the season with a record of 0–2.

Schedule

References

Rhode Island
Rhode Island Rams football seasons
College football winless seasons
Rhode Island Rams football